The three-state solution, also called the Egyptian–Jordanian solution or the Jordan–Egypt option, is an approach to peace in the Israeli–Palestinian conflict by returning control of the West Bank to Jordan and control of the Gaza Strip to Egypt.

History
The three-state solution essentially replicates the situation that existed between the 1949 Armistice Agreements and the 1967 Six-Day War. Beginning in 1949, Egypt occupied the Gaza Strip, Jordan occupied the West Bank, and no Palestinian Arab state existed. In 1950, Jordan officially annexed the West Bank and granted its Arab residents Jordanian citizenship.

Feasibility
While the two-state solution is still the prevailing option, the three-state solution is being raised with increasing frequency as the viability of the two-state solution has been repeatedly called into question. The New York Times reported in January 2009 that Egypt and Jordan are increasingly concerned about the possibility of having to retake responsibility for Gaza and the West Bank.

In a September 2008 publication of The Washington Institute for Near East Policy, Giora Eiland wrote in support of the proposal.

Proposals that the Palestinians be given Jordanian citizenship are strongly opposed by the Jordanian government.

In 2010, during the parliamentary election, Jordanian politicians expressed fears that if the 2010 Israeli-Palestinian direct talks broke down and the Palestinian Authority collapsed, Jordan would be forced to reabsorb the West Bank and grant citizenship to its residents. Concern was also expressed that Israel may prefer this solution over the traditional two-state solution.

Jordan, which back then was more than 50 percent Palestinian, would be further cemented as a de facto Palestinian state. However, some Jordanian officials have supported Jordanian control over the West Bank. In May 2010, the President of the Jordanian Senate Taher al-Masri made reference in a speech to "the two united banks [of the Jordan River], with the Hashemite Kingdom of Jordan emerging on both banks of the holy river".

Proponents
The three-state solution is advocated by an editorial in The New York Sun and Ian Bremmer, neither of whom believe that the two-state solution or the one-state solution is viable.

Former American ambassador to the United Nations John R. Bolton has suggested a "'three-state' approach, where Gaza is returned to Egyptian control and the West Bank in some configuration reverts to Jordanian sovereignty".

Daniel Pipes describes the “Jordan-Egypt option" as "a uniquely sober way” to bring peace.

Israeli MK Aryeh Eldad has proposed that Palestinian Arabs be given Jordanian citizenship.

Gerald Levin partook in discussions on building a canal from the Dead Sea at the London Foreign and Commonwealth Office in August 1997. The Dead Sea is 430 m below sea level, and so a canal for fresh sea water could be built along the Jordan River. With desalination, agricultural jobs for 1 million people within Jordan, Egypt and Israel would be sustainable. It was reported that Jordan agreed to administer between 17% and 21% of the West Bank, to facilitate canal construction with international assistance, which would increase Jordan's area to about 70% of the 1918 Palestine.

Alternative use of the phrase
The phrase three-state solution is also used not as a peace proposal, but as a description of the status quo that has existed since Hamas took control of Gaza away from the Palestinian Authority in 2007, effectively leaving three states, the Palestinian Authority-controlled West Bank, Israel, and Hamas-controlled Gaza in the territory west of the Jordan river. Others, including Kaveh L Afrasiabi, argue that the Hamas coup rendered the two-state solution impossible, and advocate the regularization of the status quo into three permanent sovereign states. In July 2012, it was reported Hamas was considering a declaration of independence with support of Egypt.

See also
 Zero-state solution
 One-state solution
 Two-state solution
 List of Middle East peace proposals
 State of Judea
 King Hussein's federation plan

References

Bibliography
Karsh, Efraim. Arafat's War: The Man and His Battle for Israeli Conquest. New York: Grove Press, 2003.

Israeli–Palestinian peace process
Egypt–Jordan relations